Haydy Adil Muhammad Kamal Morsy (born 20 September 1999) is an Egyptian modern pentathlete. She competed in the 2016 Summer Olympics at the age of 16, finishing in 35th place among the 35-woman field. Morsy won the 2019 African modern pentathlon championship, qualifying for the 2020 Summer Olympics.

References

External links 
 

1999 births
Living people
Egyptian female modern pentathletes
Modern pentathletes at the 2016 Summer Olympics
Modern pentathletes at the 2020 Summer Olympics
Olympic modern pentathletes of Egypt
Modern pentathletes at the 2014 Summer Youth Olympics
20th-century Egyptian women
21st-century Egyptian women
World Modern Pentathlon Championships medalists